Herbsaint is a brand name of anise-flavored liqueur originally created as an absinthe-substitute in New Orleans, Louisiana in 1934, and currently produced by the Sazerac Company.

It was developed by J. Marion Legendre and Reginald Parker of the city, who had learned how to make absinthe while in France during World War I. It was originally produced under the name "Legendre Absinthe", although it never contained absinthe's essential ingredient, Grande Wormwood (Artemisia absinthium).  It first went on sale following the repeal of Prohibition, and was unique in its category as an absinthe substitute, as opposed to a pastis.    The Federal Alcohol Control Administration soon objected to Legendre's use of the word "absinthe", so the name was changed to "Legendre Herbsaint",  French/Creole for "Herbe Sainte" (Sacred Herb), the Artemisia absinthium. 

The Sazerac Company bought J.M. Legendre & Co. in June 1949. Herbsaint was originally bottled at 120 proof, but this was later reduced to 100 proof, then changed to a different 90 proof recipe in the mid-1950s. By the early 1970s only the 90 proof remained. In December 2009, the Sazerac Company reintroduced J.M. Legendre's original 100 proof recipe as Herbsaint Original.

Cocktails

Herbsaint was and still is used in several cocktails, including:  

 Herbsaint frappé
 Pour two ounces of Herbsaint into a thin six-ounce glass.
 Fill the glass three-quarters full with cracked ice.
 Add a half teaspoon of simple syrup or sugar and two ounces of carbonated or plain water, then fill glass with more cracked ice.
 Stir, using a long-handled spoon with up and down motion until outside of glass is well frosted.
 Strain into another glass that has been chilled.
 Remove the ice from the original glass.
 Pour back into the well frosted glass and serve.

It is also sometimes used in the Sazerac cocktail as a substitute for absinthe.

See also
 Cuisine of New Orleans

References

External links
 The History of Legendre Herbsaint
 1944 promotional booklet for Legendre Herbsaint — Cocktail recipes and a brief history of Legendre herbsaint and the old absinthe house in New Orleans (1.76MB PDF format)

Absinthe
Cocktails with absinthe
Anise liqueurs and spirits
Sazerac Company brands
New Orleans cocktails